Socialistas liaudininkas was a weekly newspaper published in Tauragė, Lithuania between 31 October and 5 December 1926. Ladas Vladas Serbenta served as its editor and publisher of the newspaper. The publication had a 36x25 cm format. Three issues were published of the newspaper.

References

Defunct newspapers published in Lithuania
Tauragė
1926 establishments in Lithuania
1926 disestablishments in Lithuania
Publications established in 1926
Publications disestablished in 1926